Hueidea is a single-species fungal genus in the family Fuscideaceae. It contains the species Hueidea australiensis, a saxicolous (rock-dwelling), crustose lichen found on granite rocks in the Mount Kosciuszko area of New South Wales, Australia. Both the species and the genus were described as new to science in 2003 by Australian lichenologists Gintaras Kantvilas and Patrick McCarthy.

References

Umbilicariales
Lecanoromycetes genera
Lichen genera
Taxa described in 2003
Taxa named by Gintaras Kantvilas